Vivonne is a commune in the Vienne department in the Nouvelle-Aquitaine region in western France.

Louis Victor de Rochechouart de Mortemart, brother of Madame de Montespan was the duc de Vivonne.

Population

See also
Communes of the Vienne department

References

Communes of Vienne